John Rogerson (24 July 1874 - 7 May 1929) was a Scotland international rugby union player.

Rugby Union career

Amateur career

Rogerson played rugby union for Kelvinside Academicals.

Provincial career

He played for West of Scotland District against East of Scotland District on 20 January 1894.

International career

He was capped once for Scotland, in 1894.

References

1874 births
1929 deaths
Scottish rugby union players
Scotland international rugby union players
Kelvinside Academicals RFC players
Rugby union players from South Lanarkshire
West of Scotland District (rugby union) players
Rugby union fullbacks